A radial fracture may refer to:
A fracture following a radius direction
A fracture of the radius bone